Events from the year 1910 in Denmark.

Incumbents
 Monarch – Frederick VIII
 Prime minister – Carl Theodor Zahle (until 5 July), Klaus Berntsen

Events

 20 May – The 1910 Folketing election is held.
 24 June – Faaborg Museum is inaugurated in manufacturer Mads Rasmussen's apartment. The current building was built from 1912 to 1915.
 20 September – The 1910 Landsting election is held.

Date unknown
 The first separate bicycle path in Copenhagen is established around The Lakes, when the existing bridle paths are converted into isolated cycleways to accommodate the heavy growth of cycles at that time. 
 There are almost 50,000 flush toilets installed in Copenhagen.

Sports
 25 July  Thorvald Ellegaard wins silver in men's sprint at the 1910 UCI Track Cycling World Championships.

Births
 30 January – Victor Gram, politician (died 1969)
 6 March – Ejler Bille, artist (died 2004)
 10 April – Aage Leidersdorff, Olympic fencer (died 1970)
 12 July – Viggo Kampmann, politician, former prime minister (died 1976)
 1 December
 Ada Bruhn Hoffmeyer, medieval weapons expert (died 1991)
 Per Palle Storm, sculptor (died 1994)

Deaths
 26 April – Christian Vilhelm Nielsen, architect (born 1833)
 18 July – Henning Matzen, politician (born 1840)
 10 May – Palle Bruun, hydraulic engineer, designed the Port of Skagen (born 1873)
 4 November – Louise Bille-Brahe, court member (born 1830)
 15 November – Julius Exner, painter (born 1825)

References

 
Denmark
Years of the 20th century in Denmark
1910s in Denmark
Denmark